Jesse Ronson (born December 24, 1985) is a Canadian mixed martial artist who competed the Ultimate Fighting Championship (UFC) in the Lightweight division. A professional fighter since 2009, he has previously competed in promotions such as UFC, Aggression FC,  Score Fighting Series and TKO Major League MMAwhere he was the former Lightweight and Welterweight Champion.

Background
A native of the streets of London, Ontario, he fought a lot in the streets as a young kid. "...Being naturally good [at fighting], I figured I should make something of it instead of doing it on the streets and potentially getting arrested or charged." A wrestler in high school, he decided to start training in kickboxing and boxing in 2006 and switched over to MMA not long after.  He got his nickname, "Body Snatcher," in 2006, after he had 3 fights in 3 days and won all three by first-round TKO with body shots.

Mixed martial arts career

Early career
He made his professional MMA debut on November 28, 2009, at Elite 1 - Resurrection in Moncton. He defeated local favorite Eric St. Pierre with a first-round KO. He went on to win his next three bouts, but suffered his first career loss against Lindsey Hawkes at a catch weight of 163lbs.

He defeated current UFC fighter Jason Saggo by decision on August 2011. After this impressive showing, he received a shot at the AM Ford Fight Night Lightweight Championship. He defeated the champ, Brad Causey (who was coming in at 10-1 into the bout), on April 14, 2012, at AM Ford Night 2012 - Demolition via first-round KO to capture the belt.

At Score Fighting Series 7, Ronson defeated WEC and Strikeforce vet Ryan Healy, and received a shot at the Aggression FC Lightweight Championship on July 5, 2013, against Shane Campbell at AFC 19: Undisputed, where he captured the belt with a second round submission victory.

Ultimate Fighting Championship
On August 22, 2013, the UFC announced that it had signed Jesse Ronson to replace an injured Mark Bocek to take on Michel Prazeres at UFC 165 in Toronto. He lost the fight via split decision.

Ronson faced Francisco Trinaldo on January 2, 2014, at UFC Fight Night: Machida vs. Mousasi in Brazil, but lost again via split decision.

Ronson next fought Kevin Lee on July 6 at The Ultimate Fighter 19 Finale. Ronson was handed his third split decision loss in the UFC, and his third consecutive loss overall.

Post-UFC
Ronson was released after racking up three straight losses, and went on to fight Dom O'Grady at PFC 3 - Showdown in the Downtown on October 18, 2014, in London, where he dominated and won by way of TKO in the second round.

After winning at Abu Dhabi Warriors 2 against Gadji Zaipulaev by the way of D'Arce choke, he would lose by unanimous decision to Alexander Sarnavskiy on October 3, 2015, at Abu Dhabi Warriors 3.

Ronson was scheduled to face Stephen Beaumont at XFFC 8. However, Beaumont pulled out due to injury and Ronson instead faced Matt MacGrath for the XFFC Welterweight title in Grande Prairie, Alberta on December 11, 2015, losing the bout via unanimous decision.

He would follow that performance by losing to Matt Dwyer by unanimous decision on July 8, 2016, at XFFC 10, but would follow that with 5 straight wins on the regional scene, Ronson was scheduled to face Carlos Diego Ferreira on December 8, 2018, at UFC 231, replacing an injured John Makdessi. However, on December 4, 2018. It was announced that Ronson was pulled out of the fight due to being too heavy to safely make Lightweight and was released from UFC.

Instead he signed with Professional Fighters League (PFL) to take on Natan Schulte on July 25, 2019, at PFL 5, in a bout that he would lose by unanimous decision.

Ronson would made his sophomore PFL performance against Nikolay Aleksakhin on October 11, 2019, at PFL 7, losing by TKO stoppage in the first round.

Return to Ultimate Fighting Championship
After rebounding with a first round rear-naked choke against Troy Lamson at BTC 9, Ronson faced Nicolas Dalby, replacing Danny Roberts on July 26, 2020, at UFC on ESPN 14. He won the fight via submission in round one, earning his first win in the promotion. This win also earned him the Performance of the Night award. The fight result turned to no contest after Ronson received USADA handed 22 month suspension for testing positive for Metandienone and he is eligible to fight again in March 22, 2022.

Ronson faced Rafa García on April 16, 2022, at UFC on ESPN 34. He lost the fight via rear-naked choke in round two.

Ronson was scheduled to face Vinc Pichel  on October 1, 2022, at UFC Fight Night 211. However, Pichel withdraw due to an undisclosed injury and was replaced by Joaquim Silva. He lost the bout in the second round, getting dropped with a flying knee and then getting finished with ground and pound.

In late October 2022, it was reported that Ronson was released by UFC.

Post-UFC 2.0 
In his first bout post UFC, Ronson faced Nordin Asrih on December 10, 2022, at BTC 18, where he won the bout via first-round rear-naked choke.

Championships and accomplishments

Mixed martial arts
Ultimate Fighting Championship
Performance of the Night (One time) 
TKO Major League MMA
TKO Welterweight Champion (One time)
TKO Lightweight Champion (One time)
Aggression Fighting Championship
AFC Lightweight Championship (One time)
AM Ford Fight Night
AMFFN Lightweight Champion (One time)

Boxing
Canadian Amateur Boxing Association
Provincial boxing champion

Kickboxing
Kickboxing Canada
Canadian Low-Kick Middleweight Champion
Canadian Full Contact Middleweight Champion
Provincial Full Contact Middleweight champion
World Pan-Amateur Kickboxing Association
WPKA Full Contact Super Middleweight Champion
WPKA K-1 Super Middleweight Champion

Mixed martial arts record

|-
|
|align=center|
|Robert Seres
|
|Samourai MMA 5
|
|align=center|
|align=center|
|Laval, Canada
|
|-
|Win
|align=center|22–12 (1)
|Nordin Asrih
|Submission (rear-naked choke)
|BTC 18
|
|align=center|1
|align=center|3:32
|Burlington, Canada
|
|-
|Loss
|align=center|21–12 (1)
|Joaquim Silva
|TKO (knee and punches)
|UFC Fight Night: Dern vs. Yan
|
|align=center|2
|align=center|3:08
|Las Vegas, Nevada, United States
|
|-
|Loss
|align=center|21–11 (1)
|Rafa García
|Submission (rear-naked choke)
|UFC on ESPN: Luque vs. Muhammad 2 
|
|align=center|2
|align=center|4:50
|Las Vegas, Nevada, United States
|
|-
|NC
|align=center|
|Nicolas Dalby
|NC (overturned)
|UFC on ESPN: Whittaker vs. Till 
|
|align=center|1
|align=center|2:48
|Abu Dhabi, United Arab Emirates
|
|-
|Win
|align=center|21–10
|Troy Lamson	
|Submission (rear-naked choke)
|BTC 9
|
|align=center|1
|align=center|4:16
|Kitchener, Ontario, Canada
|
|-
|Loss
|align=center|20–10
|Nikolay Aleksakhin	
|TKO (punches)
|PFL 7
|
|align=center|1
|align=center|3:37
|Las Vegas, Nevada, United States
|.
|-
|Loss
|align=center|20–9
|Natan Schulte
|Decision (unanimous)
|PFL 5
|
|align=center|3
|align=center|5:00
|Atlantic City, New Jersey, United States 
|
|-
|Win
|align=center| 20–8
|Michael Dufort
|Decision (split)
|TKO 44
|
|align=center|5
|align=center|5:00
|Quebec City, Quebec, Canada
|
|-
|Win
|align=center| 19–8
|Derek Gauthier
|TKO (punches)
|TKO 41
|
|align=center|1
|align=center|	1:10
|Montreal, Quebec, Canada
|
|-
|Win
|align=center| 18–8
|Jeremie Capony
|Submission (rear-naked choke)
| ACB 72
||
|align=center|2
|align=center|1:20
|Montreal, Quebec, Canada
|
|-
|Win
|align=center| 17–8
|Derek Gauthier
|TKO (punches)
|TKO 38
||
|align=center|3
|align=center|3:49
|Montreal, Quebec, Canada
|
|-
| Win
|align=center| 16–8
|Jimmy Spicuzza
|TKO (knees and punch)
| TKO 36
|
|align=center|2
|align=center|3:06
|Montreal, Quebec, Canada
|
|-
| Loss
|align=center| 15–8
|Matt Dwyer
|Decision (unanimous)
| XFFC 10: Out of the Ashes
|
|align=center|3
|align=center|5:00
|Grande Prairie, Alberta, Canada
|
|-
| Loss
|align=center| 15–7
|Matt MacGrath
| Decision (unanimous)
| XFFC 9: Conviction
|
|align=center|5
|align=center|5:00
|Grande Prairie, Alberta, Canada
|
|-
| Loss
|align=center| 15–6
|Alexander Sarnavskiy
| Decision (unanimous)
| Abu Dhabi Warriors 3
|
|align=center|3
|align=center|5:00
|Abu Dhabi, United Arab Emirates
| 
|-
| Win
|align=center| 15–5
|Gadji Zaipulaev
|Submission (D'Arce choke)
|Abu Dhabi Warriors 2
|
|align=center|2
|align=center|3:24
|Abu Dhabi, United Arab Emirates
|
|-
| Win
|align=center| 14–5
|Dom O'Grady
| TKO (punches)
| PFC 3: Showdown in the Throwdown
|
|align=center|2
|align=center|0:45
|London, Ontario, Canada
|
|-
| Loss
|align=center| 13–5
|Kevin Lee
| Decision (split)
| The Ultimate Fighter: Team Edgar vs. Team Penn Finale
|
|align=center|3
|align=center|5:00
|Las Vegas, Nevada, United States
|
|-
| Loss
|align=center| 13–4
|Francisco Trinaldo
| Decision (split)
| UFC Fight Night: Machida vs. Mousasi
|
|align=center|3
|align=center|5:00
|Jaraguá do Sul, Brazil
|
|-
| Loss
|align=center| 13–3
|Michel Prazeres
| Decision (split)
| UFC 165
|
|align=center|3
|align=center|5:00
|Toronto, Ontario, Canada
|
|-
| Win
|align=center| 13–2
|Shane Campbell
| Submission (rear-naked choke)
| AFC 19: Undisputed
|
|align=center|2
|align=center|1:59
|Edmonton, Alberta, Canada
|Won the AFC Lightweight Championship.
|-
| Win
|align=center| 12–2
|Ryan Healy
| Decision (unanimous)
| SFS 7
|
|align=center|3
|align=center|5:00
|Hamilton, Ontario, Canada
|
|-
| Win
|align=center| 11–2
|Alex Ricci
| Decision (unanimous)
| SFS 5
|
|align=center|3
|align=center|5:00
|Hamilton, Ontario, Canada
|
|-
| Win
|align=center| 10–2
|Eric St. Pierre
| TKO (punches)
| Elite 1: Redemption
|
|align=center|1
|align=center|2:17
|Moncton, New Brunswick, Canada
|
|-
| Win
|align=center| 9–2
|Brad Causey
| KO (punches)
| AM Ford Fight Night 2012: Demolition
|
|align=center|1
|align=center|4:54
|Trail, British Columbia, Canada
|Won the AMFFN Lightweight Championship.
|-
| Win
|align=center| 8–2
|Tony Hervey
| Submission (rear-naked choke)
| SFS 3: Meltdown in the Valley
|
|align=center|2
|align=center|4:25
|Sarnia, Ontario, Canada
|
|-
| Win
|align=center| 7–2
|Jason Saggo
| Decision (split)
| GWFC 1: Uprising
|
|align=center|3
|align=center|5:00
|Hamilton, Ontario, Canada
|
|-
| Win
|align=center| 6–2
|Brandon Chagnon
| TKO (punches)
| Slammer in the Hammer
|
|align=center|1
|align=center|4:40
|Hamilton, Ontario, Canada
|Welterweight bout.
|-
| Loss
|align=center| 5–2
|Mike Ricci
| TKO (punches)
| Ringside MMA 10: Côté vs. Starnes
|
|align=center|1
|align=center|3:12
|Montreal, Quebec, Canada
|
|-
| Win
|align=center| 5–1
|Alka Matewa
| Submission (armbar)
| Wreck MMA: Strong and Proud
|
|align=center|1
|align=center|4:51
|Gatineau, Quebec, Canada
|
|-
| Loss
|align=center| 4–1
|Lindsey Hawkes
| Submission (rear-naked choke)
|Canadian Fighting Championship 6
|
|align=center|1
|align=center|4:47
|Winnipeg, Manitoba, Canada
|
|-
| Win
|align=center| 4–0
|Mark Durant
| Submission (rear-naked choke)
|Canadian Fighting Championship 5
|
|align=center|1
|align=center|4:51
|Winnipeg, Manitoba, Canada
|
|-
| Win
|align=center| 3–0
|Mike Thibodeau
| KO (punches)
|Elite 1: First Blood
|
|align=center|2
|align=center|2:34
|Moncton, New Brunswick, Canada
|
|-
| Win
|align=center| 2–0
|Luis Cepeda-Javier
| TKO (punches)
|Canadian Fighting Championship 4
|
|align=center|2
|align=center|3:17
|Winnipeg, Manitoba, Canada
|
|-
| Win
|align=center| 1–0
|Eric St. Pierre
| KO (punches)
|Elite 1: Resurrection
|
|align=center|1
|align=center|3:52
|Moncton, New Brunswick, Canada
|
|-

References

External links

Living people
1985 births
Canadian male mixed martial artists
Martial artists from Ontario
Sportspeople from London, Ontario
Lightweight mixed martial artists
Welterweight mixed martial artists
Mixed martial artists utilizing boxing
Mixed martial artists utilizing kickboxing
Canadian male boxers
Canadian male kickboxers
Middleweight kickboxers
Ultimate Fighting Championship male fighters
Doping cases in mixed martial arts
Canadian sportspeople in doping cases